Lee and Oli Barrett are a pair of British YouTubers based in Shenzhen, China.

Lee is the father and had lived in China for a period since before 2019. Oli, the son, formerly operated a YouTube channel related to Call of Duty and moved to China in 2019. Their channel was established circa June 2019. By May 2020 the two had 100,000 subscribers. By June 2021, they had 29 million views. By July of the same year, Lee Barrett was working as a stringer for China Global Television Network.

According to The Sunday Times, the Chinese government sponsors the Barretts for their content, but the allegation was disputed by Lee Barrett on their YouTube channel, claiming that they have taken expenses-paid trips sponsored by government affiliated entities, but had had full editorial independence for their content output.

Content
The Barretts make content defending the Chinese government and its surveillance program, stating that the Xinjiang concentration camps do not exist, and that Western media are making unfair accusations against China. Ethan Paul of the South China Morning Post wrote that "Defending China" was "The key to their rapid audience expansion". Ellery and Knowles wrote that as the Barrets took stances firmer in support of the Chinese government, "the number of subscribers increased exponentially". The two argued against the description "pro-democracy" for the anti-Hong Kong government protesters in the 2019–20 Hong Kong protests, and that the Xinjiang internment camps are good.

See also
 Britons in China
 White monkey - Phenomenon of white foreigners or immigrants in China being hired for modeling, advertising, or promotional jobs on the basis of their skin colour.
 Afu Thomas - German social media figure in China
 Raz Gal-Or - Israeli social media figure in China
 Dashan - Canadian television personality in China
 David Gulasi - Australian internet celebrity active in China
 Amy Lyons - Australian internet celebrity active in China
 Winston Sterzel - South African social media figure in China
 China–United Kingdom relations

References

People from Shenzhen
Living people
Video bloggers
British expatriates in China
Year of birth missing (living people)